William Draper Harkins (December 28, 1873 – March 7, 1951) was an American physical chemist, noted for his contributions to surface chemistry and nuclear chemistry. Harkins researched the structure of the atomic nucleus and was the first to propose the principle of nuclear fusion, four years before Jean Baptiste Perrin published his theory in 1919-20. His findings enabled, among other things, the development of the H-bomb.  As a visiting professor with Fritz Haber in 1909, he was introduced to the study of surface tension, and he began work on the theory of solutions and solubility during a visit to MIT in 1909-1910.

Harkins was born in Titusville, Pennsylvania, and graduated with a PhD from Stanford University in 1907. He subsequently taught chemistry at the University of Montana from 1900 to 1912, and then spent the rest of his career at the University of Chicago.

Harkins correctly predicted the existence of the neutron in 1920 (as a proton–electron complex) and was the first to use the word "neutron" in connection with the atomic nucleus. The neutron was detected experimentally by James Chadwick in 1932. In the beginning of the 1930s, Harkins built a cyclotron. From experiments with this, he concluded that the sun might be powered by nuclear fusion.  Among other University of Chicago scientists who made use of this cyclotron was Enrico Fermi, who performed neutron diffusion experiments.  Since 1978, the magnet yoke of the cyclotron Harkins built has been on display at Fermilab.
Among his students were Robert Mulliken, Lyle Benjamin Borst, Calvin Souther Fuller, Martin Kamen, Henry W. Newson, Samuel Allison, and Robert James Moon, Jr. (1911–1989).

Harkins died in Chicago. He is buried at Oak Woods Cemetery.

References

External links
William Draper Harkins Academic Genealogy and List of PhD Students
 Guide to the William D. Harkins Papers 1877-1988 at the University of Chicago Special Collections Research Center

1873 births
1951 deaths
People from Titusville, Pennsylvania
American chemists
University of Montana faculty
University of Chicago faculty
Stanford University alumni
People involved with the periodic table